Creontiades rubrinervis is a species of plant bug in the family Miridae. It is found in Central America, North America, and South America.

References

Further reading

External links

 

Articles created by Qbugbot
Insects described in 1862
Mirini